Peter Kommer Parnall (born May 23, 1936) is an American artist and writer, best known for his work on books for younger readers. His work has earned him high praise and a number of awards. Some of his books have become collector items.

Biography
Peter Parnall was born in Syracuse, New York on May 23, 1936. He was raised in a little town called Willow Springs in the Mojave Desert. He went to Cornell in 1954 because he wanted to become a veterinarian, but got pneumonia and failed his freshman mid-terms. After leaving Cornell he went west to train horses. When his father's birthday came around he drew him a picture of a horse. His father hung it on the wall and told him he should go back to school for art. He attended the Pratt Institute for two years, until he got bored and left. He had a freelance advertising business (with clients including Mr. Potato Head and G.I. Joe), which he enjoyed but eventually "got tired of convincing people they should buy stuff they don’t need."

Works 

He has illustrated over eighty books written by others and has
authored and self-illustrated several books of his own, often studies of habitats. His favorite medium is pen and ink of subjects from the natural world. 
Many of his works have been separately published in limited editions as signed and numbered prints.

As Author and Illustrator
 1973: The Great Fish (Doubleday)
 1975: Alfalfa Hill (Doubleday)
 1977: A Dog's Book of Birds (Scribner)
 1984: Daywatchers (Macmillan)
 1986: Winter Barn (Macmillan)
 1988: Apple Tree (Macmillan)
 1988: Feet! (Macmillan)
 1989: Quiet (Morrow)
 1989: Cats from Away (Macmillan)
 1990: Woodpile (Macmillan)
 1991: The Rock (Macmillan)
 1991: Marsh Cat (Macmillan)
 1991: Mountain (Doubleday)
 1992: Stuffer (Macmillan)
 1993: Spaces (Millbrook)
 1993: Waterpup (Macmillan)

As illustrator
 1960: A Picture Book of Interesting Words, illustrated by Peter Parnall; text: Judith Klugman (Hart)
 1962: Beyond Your Doorstep, illustrated by Peter Parnall; text Hal Borland (Knopf)
 1965: Of House and Cats, illustrated by Peter Parnall; text Eunice De Chazeau (Random House)
 1966: A Tale of Middle Length, illustrated by Peter Parnall; text: Mary Francis Shura (Atheneum)
 1967: A Dog's Book of Bugs, illustrated by Peter Parnall; text: Elizabeth Griffen (Atheneum)
 1967: Knee-Deep in Thunder, illustrated by Peter Parnall; text: Sheila Moon (Atheneum)
 1968: Desert Solitaire, illustrated by Peter Parnall; text: Edward Abbey (McGraw-Hill) (subsequent editions illus. by Lawrence Ormsby)
 1968: Tall Tales of the Catskills, illustrated by Peter Parnall; text: Frank L. DuMond (Atheneum)
 1969: A Beastly Circus, illustrated by Peter Parnall; text: Peggy Parish (Simon & Schuster)
 1969: Apricot ABC, illustrated by Peter Parnall; text: Miska Miles (Little, Brown)
 1970: But Ostriches, illustrated by Peter Parnall; text: Aileen Fisher (Crowell)
 1970: Doctor Rabbit, illustrated by Peter Parnall; text: Jan Wahl (Delacorte)
 1971: A Squirrel of One's Own, illustrated by Peter Parnall; text: Douglas Fairbairn (McCall)
 1971: Big Frog, Little Pond, illustrated by Peter Parnall; George Mendoza (McCall)
 1971: Annie and The Old One, illustrated by Peter Parnall; text: Miska Miles (Little, Brown)
 1971: The Nightwatchers, illustrated by Peter Parnall ; text Anugus Cameron (Four Winds Press)
 1973: A Little Book of Beasts, illustrated by Peter Parnall; text: Mary Ann Hoberman (Simon & Schuster)
 1974: Everybody Needs A Rock, illustrated by Peter Parnall; text: Byrd Baylor (Scribner) (Note: This was included as a promotional book in Cheerios boxes in 2007.)
 1976: The Desert is Theirs, illustrated by Peter Parnall; text: Byrd Baylor (Scribner) (Caldecott Honor)
 1976: A Natural History of Marine Mammals, illustrated by Peter Parnall; text: Victor Blanchard Scheffer (Scribner)
 1977: Hawk, I'm Your Brother, illustrated by Peter Parnall; text: Byrd Baylor (Scribner) (Caldecott Honor)
 1978: The Other Way to Listen , illustrated by Peter Parnall; text: Byrd Baylor (Scribner)
 1979: The Way to Start a Day, illustrated by Peter Parnall; text: Byrd Baylor (Scribner) (Caldecott Honor)
 1980: If You Are a Hunter of Fossils, illustrated by Peter Parnall; text: Byrd Baylor (Scribner)
 1981: Desert Voices, illustrated by Peter Parnall; text: Byrd Baylor (Scribner)
 1985: Between Cattails, illustrated by Peter Parnall; text: Terry Tempest Williams (Atheneum)
 1986: I'm In Charge of Celebrations, illustrated by Peter Parnall; text: Byrd Baylor (Scribner)
 1986: Cat Will Rhyme With Hat, illustrated by Peter Parnall; text: Jean Chapman (Scribner)
 1992: Become A Bird And Fly, illustrated by Peter Parnall; text: Michael E. Ross (Millbrook)
 1994: The Table Where Rich People Sit, illustrated by Peter Parnall; text: Byrd Baylor (Scribner)

References 

Citations

External links
 

 Peter Parnall Biography at The Greenwich Workshop

1936 births
American children's book illustrators
American children's writers
Living people